Kurt Waldemar Tschenscher (5 October 1928 – 13 August 2014) was a German football referee.

Born in Schimischow, Weimar Germany (today Szymiszów, Poland), Tschenscher took up refereeing in 1948 and by 1953 he was part of the German Football Association's group of top referees. Within another five years, he was promoted to the FIFA list of international referees. In October 1959, he refereed the second leg of Yugoslavia's 1960 European Nations' Cup first round win over Bulgaria. In September 1962, he took charge of the replay of the 1962 European Cup Winners' Cup Final, in which Atlético Madrid beat Fiorentina 3–0.

By 1966, Tschenscher was one of the top referees in Europe, a fact reflected in his appointment to the first leg of the 1965–66 European Cup semi-final between Partizan and Manchester United, and then a group stage match between Brazil and Bulgaria at the 1966 FIFA World Cup. The following season, he was named as the referee for the 1967 European Cup Final between Celtic and Internazionale.

He was appointed to quarter-finals at both Euro 1968 and Euro 1972, and a semi-final at Euro 1968, as well as the opening group stage game between Mexico and the Soviet Union at the 1970 World Cup, which saw him become the first referee to show a yellow card in a match. He also refereed a second-round game at the 1974 World Cup. Thus he is the only referee that was nominated by the FIFA for three World Cups. In total he was a FIFA referee for 17 years, which is the record in FIFA history.

In 1971, Tschenscher officiated Pelé's final game for Brazil, at the end of which he received the jersey worn by the Brazilian.

References

External links
 Profile at worldfootball.net
 Profile at WorldReferee.com

1928 births
2014 deaths
German football referees
1966 FIFA World Cup referees
1970 FIFA World Cup referees
1974 FIFA World Cup referees
People from the Province of Silesia
People from Strzelce County
Olympic football referees
Recipients of the Cross of the Order of Merit of the Federal Republic of Germany
UEFA Euro 1968 referees